All-purpose may refer to:

 All-purpose cleaner, such as hard-surface cleaner
 All-purpose flour
 All-purpose Lightweight Individual Carrying Equipment (ALICE), United States Army standard system of load-carrying equipment
 All-purpose programming language, such as BASIC (Beginners All-purpose Symbolic Instruction Code) and Perl
 All-purpose road, in the United Kingdom, any road that is not a special road
 All-purpose room, such as a family room or living room
 All-purpose yardage, in American football

See also
 All (disambiguation)
 Purpose (disambiguation)